Rožňava District (okres Rožňava) is a district in the Košice Region of eastern Slovakia. 
Until 1918, the district was mostly part of the county of Kingdom of Hungary of Gömör és Kishont, apart from the area in the south-east around the municipalities of Silická Jablonica, Hrušov, Jablonov nad Turňou and Hrhov which formed part of the county of Abaúj-Torna.

Municipalities

Ardovo
Betliar
Bohúňovo
Bôrka
Brdárka
Bretka
Brzotín
Čierna Lehota
Čoltovo
Čučma
Dedinky
Dlhá Ves
Dobšiná
Drnava
Gemerská Hôrka
Gemerská Panica
Gemerská Poloma
Gočaltovo
Gočovo
Hanková
Henckovce
Honce
Hrhov
Hrušov
Jablonov nad Turňou
Jovice
Kečovo
Kobeliarovo
Koceľovce
Kováčová
Krásnohorská Dlhá Lúka
Krásnohorské Podhradie
Kružná
Kunova Teplica
Lipovník
Lúčka
Markuška
Meliata
Nižná Slaná
Ochtiná
Pača
Pašková
Petrovo
Plešivec
Rakovnica
Rejdová
Rochovce
Roštár
Rozložná
Rožňava
Rožňavské Bystré
Rudná
Silica
Silická Brezová
Silická Jablonica
Slavec
Slavoška
Slavošovce
Stratená
Štítnik
Vlachovo
Vyšná Slaná

References

Districts of Slovakia
Geography of Košice Region